Kuno or KUNO may refer to:

Broadcasting
KUNO (AM), a radio station (1400 AM) licensed to Corpus Christi, Texas, United States
KUNO-TV, the former call letters of current television station, KQSL (channel 8) licensed to Fort Bragg, California, United States

Places
Kuno Wildlife Sanctuary in Madhya Pradesh, India

Electronics
KUNO branded Android tablets made for the education market.

People
Given name
 Kuno (given name)

Surname
Ayaka Kuno (born 1987), Japanese sprint canoer
Hisashi Kuno (1910–1969), Japanese geologist
Junya Kuno (born 1988), Japanese football player
Katsura Kuno
Makiko Kuno (born 1967), Japanese actress
Misaki Kuno (born 1993), Japanese actress and voice actress
Seiichi Kuno (1887–1962), Japanese military commander
Susumu Kuno (born 1933), Japanese linguist
Tomoaki Kuno (born 1973), Japanese football player

Fictional characters
Yoko Kuno from All About Lily Chou-Chou
from Ranma ½:
Tatewaki Kuno
Kodachi Kuno
Principal Kuno
Kuno from "The Machine Stops", E.M.Forster

Other 
 Kuno (dog) a recipient of the Dickin Medal

Japanese-language surnames